Fuda may be:
Fuda Station, Keiō Line, Chōfu, Tokyo
Ofuda, talisman issued by Shinto shrine
Fuda Cancer Hospital-Guangzhou

People with the surname
Ryoko Fuda, Japanese women's tennis player